The Tragedy of a Night of Passion is a 1924 German silent drama film directed by Franz Osten and starring Dary Holm, John Mylong and Georg H. Schnell.

It was shot at the Emelka Studios in Munich. The film's sets were designed by the art director Willy Reiber.

Cast
Dary Holm
Hanna Lierke
John Mylong
Georg H. Schnell
Karl Falkenberg

References

Bibliography

External links

Films of the Weimar Republic
German silent feature films
Films directed by Franz Osten
German black-and-white films
Bavaria Film films
Films shot at Bavaria Studios
1920s German films